Aaron Barker (born March 5, 1953 in San Antonio, Texas) is an American singer-songwriter.

Barker has written No. 1 songs for George Strait ("Baby Blue", "Love Without End, Amen", "Easy Come, Easy Go") and Lonestar ("What About Now"). His songs have also been recorded by Doug Supernaw, Clay Walker, Neal McCoy, Aaron Tippin and others. Barker turned "Love Without End, Amen" into a book in 2002. He was inducted into the Texas Heritage Songwriters' Hall of Fame in 2007.

Barker's debut album, The Taste of Freedom, was released by Atlantic Records in August 1992. The title track peaked at number 73 on the Billboard Hot Country Singles & Tracks chart.

Barker also writes and performs commercials for Blue Bell Ice Cream.

On August 8, 2016, it was announced at a private press conference that Barker would be inducted into the Nashville Songwriters Hall of Fame at a ceremony held on October 9, 2016.

Discography

Albums

Singles

Music videos

List of singles written by Aaron Barker

References

1953 births
American country singer-songwriters
American male singer-songwriters
Country musicians from Texas
Living people
Musicians from San Antonio
Atlantic Records artists
Singer-songwriters from Texas